Mary Boomer Page (? - December 3, 1927) of Chicago, Illinois was director of the Gertrude House settlement and president of the Kindergarten Literature Company.

References

Year of birth missing
1927 deaths
19th-century American women
20th-century American women
19th-century American educators
20th-century American educators